The 2023 season is the 109th in Sociedade Esportiva Palmeiras' existence. This season Palmeiras is participating in the Campeonato Paulista, Copa Libertadores, Copa do Brasil, Série A and the Supercopa do Brasil.

Squad information 
.

Transfers

Transfers in

Transfers out

Competitions

Overview

Campeonato Paulista 

Palmeiras was drawn into Group D.

First stage

Quarter-final

Semi-final

Finals

Copa Libertadores

Group stage

Série A

Standings

Matches 
The full schedule was announced on 14 February 2023.

Copa do Brasil

Third round

Supercopa do Brasil 

Palmeiras qualified for the 2023 Supercopa do Brasil by winning the 2022 Campeonato Brasileiro Série A.

Statistics

Overall statistics

Goalscorers 
In italic players who left the team in mid-season.

External links 
 Official site

References 

2023
Palmeiras